Clarence Edwards (March 25, 1933 – May 20, 1993) was an American blues musician from Louisiana, best known for his recordings of "Lonesome Bedroom Blues" and "I Want Somebody". It was not until the late 1980s that Edwards was able to establish his reputation as a blues performer, assisted by his producer and manager Stephen Coleridge.

Biography
Edwards was born in Lindsay, Louisiana, one of fourteen children, and relocated with his family at the age of twelve to Baton Rouge. He joined the Boogie Beats, a local blues band, along with one of his brothers, Cornelius, in the mid-1950s, and later played in the Bluebird Kings. Edwards was shot in the leg in a fracas outside a club in Alsen.

Initially, Edwards found full-time employment on a farm, but he later worked for thirty years at Thomas Scrap. Dr. Harry Oster recorded Edwards between 1959 and 1961, with Cornelius and the violin player Butch Cage. By 1970, when he next recorded, for the producer Mike Vernon, Edwards had moved from an older styling to a more contemporary approach. He was not widely known until the late 1980s, when he performed on the national blues festival circuit.

Swampin''' (1991) and Louisiana Swamp Blues, Vol. 4 (1993) showcased the range of Edwards's style, which gained appreciation among blues aficionados.

Edwards died in May 1993, in Louisiana, at the age of 60.

His earlier work was posthumously remastered and issued on the CD Swamps the Word. The compilation album I Looked Down That Railroad was released in 2003.

DiscographySwampin', 1991 (New Rose Records)Louisiana Swamp Blues, Vol. 4, 1993 (Wolf Records)Swamps the Word, 1998 (Blues Factory)I Looked Down That Railroad'', 2003 (Last Call)

See also
List of swamp blues musicians
List of Louisiana blues musicians

References

External links
Discography details

1933 births
1993 deaths
Swamp blues musicians
American blues guitarists
American male guitarists
American blues singers
Songwriters from Louisiana
Blues musicians from Louisiana
Louisiana blues musicians
Electric blues musicians
20th-century American singers
20th-century American guitarists
Singers from Louisiana
Guitarists from Louisiana
20th-century American male singers
American male songwriters